Ross Calman is a New Zealand Māori writer, editor, historian, and translator of the Māori language.

Early life and career
Calman was born in Upper Hutt in the early 1970s, and grew up in Auckland, Rotorua and Taranaki. His mother camed from a Pākehā farming family in Rotorua while his father's parentage included a Māori mother descended from Ngāti Toa, Ngāti Raukawa ki te Tonga, and Ngāi Tahu. Calman is also a descendent of the famous rangatira (chief) Te Rauparaha through a peace marriage between Te Rauparaha's granddaughter Ria Te Uira and Peneta Nohoa from Ngāi Tahu iwi.

At the University of Canterbury, Calman studied English literature. At Te Wānanga o Raukawa in Ōtaki, he studied te reo Māori (Māori language). His career began in government and publishing, where he specialised in reo and kaupapa Māori (Māori language and topics). At the same time, he edited and revised many classic reference works on Māori subjects by Reed Publishers and wrote introductory books on the Treaty of Waitangi and the New Zealand Wars, and numerous articles on historical topics for the School Journal and for Te Ara: The Encyclopedia of New Zealand.

In 2014, Calman embarked on the project to edit and translate Tāmihana Te Rauparaha's 50,000-word manuscript account of the life of his father, the Ngāti Toa chief Te Rauparaha. The project took six years to complete, with the publication of He Pukapuka Tātaku i ngā Mahi a Te Rauparaha Nui / A Record of the Life of the Great Te Rauparaha in 2020. In 2019, Calman was recognised with Te Toi Reo Māori, the professional translator’s qualification administered by Te Taura Whiri i te Reo Māori, the Māori Language Commission.

Calman married Ariana Tikao, a singer, composer, musician, librarian and writer, in 2002 and they have two children.

Selected works

As author
 Ka ipoipo te manu. Ngāi Tahu Development Corporation. (2002)
 The New Zealand wars. Reed. (2004)
 The Treaty of Waitangi, Bilingual edition. Lift Education. (2019)

As editor
 The Reed essential Māori dictionary. Reed. (2001)
 The Reed Māori picture dictionary. Reed. (2003)
 The Reed book of Māori mythology. Reed. (2004)
 The Raupo essential Māori dictionary. Penguin. (2008)
 Favourite Māori legends. Reed. (2013)
 He Atua, he tangata : the world of Māori mythology, 3rd edition. Oratia Books. (2021)

As translator
 He pukapuka tātaku i ngā mahi a Te Rauparaha nui / A record of the life of the great Te Rauparaha / by Tamihana Te Rauparaha. Auckland University Press (2020).
 Mokorua : ngā korero mō tōku moko kauae : my story of moko kauae / by Ariana Tikao. Auckland University Press. (2022)

References 

1970s births
Living people
Ngāi Tahu people
Ngāti Toa people
Ngāti Raukawa people
People from Upper Hutt
University of Canterbury alumni
21st-century New Zealand writers
21st-century New Zealand male writers
20th-century New Zealand writers
20th-century New Zealand male writers
New Zealand Māori writers